Valtos can refer to:

 Bhaltos, Lewis or Valtos, the largest village in Uig, Lewis in the Outer Hebrides
 Valtos Province in Aetolia-Acarnania in western Greece
 Valtos, Skye, a village on the Isle of Skye
 Valtos Sandstone Formation, a geological formation named after the village on Skye
 Valtos (Black Clover), a character in the manga series Black Clover
 Valtos are an ‘Electronic-Traditional’ duo composed of Isle of Skye based Martyn MacDonald and Daniel Docherty.